Ing-Marie Olsson  (born 23 February 1966) is a Swedish footballer who played as a goalkeeper for the Sweden women's national football team. She was part of the team at the inaugural 1991 FIFA Women's World Cup. At the club level she played for Malmö FF in Sweden. Her first club was Löberöds IF.

References

External links
 

1966 births
Living people
Swedish women's footballers
Sweden women's international footballers
Place of birth missing (living people)
1991 FIFA Women's World Cup players
Women's association football goalkeepers